The 2019 Primera División season, officially Liga de Fútbol Profesional Venezolano or Liga FUTVE, was the 38th professional season of Venezuela's top-flight football league. Zamora were the defending champions, but in the Torneo Apertura they were knocked out by Mineros in the quarter-finals and in the Torneo Clausura they failed to advance to the knockout stage. The champions were Caracas, who won the Torneo Clausura by defeating Deportivo Táchira in the final and then went on to beat Apertura winners Estudiantes de Mérida in the Serie Final on penalties to claim their twelfth league title.

Teams

Stadia and locations

{|

|}

Managerial changes

Torneo Apertura

The Torneo Apertura is the first tournament of the season. The regular season started on 26 January and ended on 19 May.

Standings

Results

Knockout stage

Quarter-finals

|}

First leg

Second leg

Semi-finals

|}

First leg

Second leg

Final

Tied 0–0 on aggregate, Estudiantes de Mérida won on penalties.

Top goalscorers

Source: Liga FUTVE

Torneo Clausura
The Torneo Clausura is the second tournament of the season. The regular season started on 26 July and ended on 10 November.

Standings

Results

Knockout stage

Quarter-finals

|}

First leg

Second leg

Semi-finals

|}

First leg

Second leg

Final

Tied 3–3 on aggregate, Caracas won on away goals.

Top goalscorers

Source: Liga FUTVE

Serie Final
The Serie Final was held between the champions of the Torneo Apertura and the Torneo Clausura to decide the champions of the season. The team out of both finalists with the best placement in the aggregate table hosted the second leg.

First leg

Second leg

Tied 2–2 on aggregate, Caracas won on penalties.

Aggregate table

References

External links
  of the Venezuelan Football Federation 
 Liga FUTVE

Venezuelan Primera División season
Venezuelan Primera División seasons
1